St Hilda's church, Egton, is a Church of England church in Egton, North Yorkshire, built in 1879 and designed by local architect E. H. Smales. St Hilda’s is one of five churches in the United Benefice of Middle Esk Moor.

History

Norman era
The original Norman church of St Hilda's was located in Glaisdale Lane, around 1km to the west of Egton village. The Norman church stood until its demolition in 1878.

19th century
In the 1870s the decision was taken to build a new church and school closer to the centre of Egton village. Construction of the new church of St Hilda's was enabled by the Foster family, philanthropic local landowners. The church was completed between 1878 and 1879; it was consecrated in December 1879.  The architect was Edward H. Smales. The church is constructed from tooled sandstone with sandstone ashlar
dressings, and has a stone slate roof. The church contains a number of memorials to members of the Foster family.

Following demolition, little of the old Norman church was left, apart from the graveyard and a Mortuary Chapel built in 1897. Some evidence of the old church remains; the bases of three Norman pillars are still visible.

20th Century

In 1969 St Hilda's became a Grade II listed building.

See also
Egton Manor
John Foster

Gallery

Notes

References
 Laurence, Alastair, Old Egton: A New History, Whitby Press 2018

External links
Official website Retrieved 21 April 2022
britishlistedbuildings.co.uk Retrieved 17 April 2022
St Hilda's, Egton at shipoffools.com Retrieved 21 April 2022

Buildings and structures in Yorkshire
Church of England church buildings in Yorkshire